James Altucher (born January 22, 1968) is an American hedge-fund manager, author, podcaster and entrepreneur who has founded or cofounded over 20 companies. He has published 20 books and is a contributor to publications including The Financial Times, The Wall Street Journal, TechCrunch, and The Huffington Post.

Early life
Altucher was raised in a Jewish family in North Brunswick, New Jersey. Altucher attended North Brunswick Township High School and graduated in 1986. Altucher graduated from Cornell University with a bachelor's degree in computer science in 1989.  Altucher's first job after graduating was in the IT department at HBO. At one point, Altucher hosted an HBO program, III:am.

In 1998, Altucher left HBO, sold a company he founded, Reset Inc., for approximately $15 million, and used the proceeds to fund new internet investments. Altucher has said he began this period with $15 million and lost it all in two years, which led him to re-evaluate his approach to both business and life. During this time, Jim Cramer of TheStreet.com hired him to write about stocks, and Altucher began trading for hedge funds.

From 2002 to 2005, he traded for several hedge funds, and from 2004 to 2006, he ran a fund of hedge funds.

In 2006, Altucher founded the financial social network, StockPickr. The website was named one of Time Magazine'''s 50 Best Websites of 2007. Altucher sold the company for $10 million in 2007.

In 2017, he began advising on cryptocurrency investing, despite having condemned Bitcoin in 2013 as "a fad, or a scam, or a ponzi scheme, or worse." However, in May, 2013, he built a store to sell his book, "Choose Yourself" for Bitcoin a month before he released it on Amazon. He was interviewed by Business Insider about why he reversed his stance on Bitcoin.

Altucher was a seed investor in Buddy Media, which later sold to Salesforce.com for $745 million in 2012.

Altucher has a chapter giving advice in Tim Ferriss' book Tools of Titans.

Podcasts
Question of the Day
In August 2015, Altucher launched a podcast with Stephen Dubner, co-author of Freakonomics, called Question of the Day, based on questions from Quora. This has since finished but had a reunion in 2020.

The James Altucher Show
Altucher also hosts The James Altucher Show, which has featured Tim Ferriss, Mark Cuban, and Arianna Huffington, among others. Altucher says it has more than 40 million downloads.

Authorship
The author of over 20 books, Altucher's work has appeared on The Wall Street Journal best-seller list and USA Todays list of best business books of all time in 2014.

 Skip the Line: The 10,000 Experiments Rule and Other Surprising Advice for Reaching Your Goals (2021) 
 What To Do When You Are Rejected? (2018) 
 Reinvent Yourself (2017) 
 My Daddy Owns All of Outer Space (2016) 
 The Power of ASK: Ask for What You Want, Get What You Want (2015) 
 The Choose Yourself Guide to Wealth (2015) 
 The Rich Employee (2015) 
 The Power of No (2014) 
 The Choose Yourself Stories (2014) 
 Choose Yourself: Be Happy, Make Millions, Live the Dream (2013) 
 The Seven Habits of Highly Effective Mediocre People (2013) 
 Faq Me (2012) 
 40 Alternatives to College (2012) 
 How To Be The Luckiest Person Alive! (2011) 
 I Was Blind But Now I See: Time to Be Happy (2011) 
 The Altucher Confidential: Ideas for a World Out of Balance, a Round Table Comic (2011) 
 The Wall Street Journal Guide to Investing in the Apocalypse: Make Money by Seeing Opportunity Where Others See Peril (2011) 
 The Forever Portfolio: How to Pick Stocks that You Can Hold for the Long Run (2008) 
 SuperCash: The New Hedge Fund Capitalism (2006) 
 Trade Like Warren Buffett (2005) 
 Trade Like a Hedge Fund: 20 Successful Uncorrelated Strategies and Techniques to Winning Profits'' (2004)

Personal life

Altucher is a co-owner of Stand Up NY, where he also performs stand-up comedy. He is a National Chess Master with an Elo rating of 2204 as of 2012.

References

External links
 James Altucher on CNBC in 2017
 

1968 births
Living people
21st-century American non-fiction writers
Cornell University alumni
American bloggers
American business writers
American economics writers
American finance and investment writers
American hedge fund managers
American male bloggers
American male writers
American podcasters
Carnegie Mellon University alumni
Jewish American writers 
People from North Brunswick, New Jersey